Blood Cross is one of American photographer Andres Serranos early religious-themed postmodernist images, released in 1985, two years before the controversial Piss Christ was debuted. This image depicted a plexiglass cross filled with cow's blood; the cross leaked slightly making it appear as though it was bleeding. It was exhibited along with Milk, Blood as part of Serrano's Fluids series.

In 1999 a print of Blood Cross fetched £17,825 at auction, considerably higher than the original estimate of £5,000–8,000.

References

Postmodern art
1985 works
1985 in art
Christianity and society in the United States
Color photographs
1980s photographs